Kidwell Airport  is a public use airport located south of Cal-Nev-Ari, in Clark County, Nevada, United States.

Facilities and aircraft 
Kidwell Airport covers an area of 103 acres (42 ha) at an elevation of 2,605 feet (794 m) above mean sea level. It has one runway designated 15/33 with a dirt surface measuring 4,140 by 65 feet (1,262 x 20 m).

For the 12-month period ending January 31, 2011, the airport had 3,500 general aviation aircraft operations, an average of 291 per month. At that time there were 17 aircraft based at this airport: 76.5% single-engine, 17.6% ultralight, and 5.9% multi-engine.

See also 
 List of airports in Nevada

References

External links 
  from Nevada DOT
 Cal-Nev-Ari article from SW Aviator Magazine, Feb/Mar 2001
 
 Aerial image as of May 1994 from USGS The National Map
 

Airports in Clark County, Nevada
Piute Valley
Residential airparks